Tepeköy is a village in the Damal District, Ardahan Province, Turkey. Its population is 87 (2021).

References

Villages in Damal District